Jennifer Sullivan (born June 4, 1983) is an American basketball coach who is currently the head women's basketball coach at Florida Atlantic University.

Career
She was previously an assistant coach at the University of Tennessee, and has also had coaching stops at Ohio State, Missouri State, and Louisiana.

Head coaching record

References

External links 
 
 Florida Atlantic Owls profile

1983 births
Living people
Sportspeople from Memphis, Tennessee
People from Jonesboro, Arkansas
Basketball players from Memphis, Tennessee
Basketball players from Arkansas
Basketball coaches from Tennessee
Basketball coaches from Arkansas
Memphis Tigers women's basketball players
Rhodes Lynx women's basketball coaches
McNeese Cowgirls basketball coaches
Arkansas State Red Wolves women's basketball coaches
Louisiana Ragin' Cajuns women's basketball coaches
Missouri State Lady Bears basketball coaches
Ohio State Buckeyes women's basketball coaches
Tennessee Lady Volunteers basketball coaches
Florida Atlantic Owls women's basketball coaches